From Chaos to 1984 is a live album by English punk rock/Oi! band, The 4-Skins. Released in 1984 on Syndicate Records, it is the band's third and final album. Recorded in mid-1984 in front of an invited audience of friends at a studio in Waterloo Road, London, the album documents the band's farewell concert and final recordings (until 2007's partial reunion).

Track listing
(all songs written by The 4-Skins.)
"Wonderful World"
"Jealousy"
"On the Streets"
"Johnny Go Home"
"1984"
"Bread or Blood"
"Saturday"
"A.C.A.B."
"City Boy"
"Five More Years"
"Evil"
"On File"
"Clockwork Skinhead"
"Chaos"

Personnel
Roi Pearce - lead vocals
Hoxton Tom McCourt - bass guitar
Ian Bransom - drums
Paul Swain - guitar

References

The 4-Skins albums
1984 live albums